Follo (old spelling Foldouge) is one of three traditional and judicional districts in the former fylke (county) of Akershus, Norway - south east of Oslo towards the former county of Østfold, the other two regions being Romerike (east of Oslo following european route E6 going east and then north in Norway) and Asker og Bærum (west of Oslo). Follo borders Oslo to the North-West, fellow Akershus district Romerike to the North-East and East, and Østfold to the south.

The municipalities of Frogn and Vestby have coast lines along the Oslofjord. Ås and Oppegård have coast lines along the Bunnefjord (a part of the Oslofjord that extends south-east), and Nesodden has coast lines along both fjords.

In the displayed map of Akershus, the municipalities are numbered. Follo consists of: Nesodden (13), Frogn (7), Vestby (21), Oppegård (15), Ås (22), Ski (18), and Enebakk (5). Follo covers around 819 km², and had a population of 121 368 on October 1, 2007.

As with other traditional districts in Norway, Follo has no official political or administrative significance - the regional administrative entity is the fylke, while the local administrative entities are the kommuner (municipalities). It does, however, have judicional significance, as a local police and court district. It also has practical significance, as the municipalities within the district tend to cooperate for practical and economical purposes.

The largest town, and de facto district capital, is Ski. This is where judicial functions such as Follo  Tingrett (Follo district court) and Follo Politikammer (Follo Police District) are located, and where the cooperating municipalities tend to concentrate administrative functions and public services.

All municipalities in Follo are within an hour's drive from Oslo, and large parts of the workforce actually work in Oslo. Apart from the long coastline, Follo has extensive woods and farmland, and only little industry. Most parts of Follo are well suited for outdoor activities, and many athletes have come from this district – such as Trine Hattestad (javelin), Jon Rønningen (wrestling), and Siren Sundby (sailing).

The name
The Norse form of the name was Folló (from *Foldló). The first element is the old name of Oslofjord (see Østfold and Vestfold), the last element is ló f 'meadow' (see also Lom and Oslo).

Politics
After the local elections in 2015 five of the municipalities (Ski, Ås, Enebakk, Nesodden and Vestby) have a mayor from the Labour Party, while two (Oppegård and Frogn) have a mayor from the Conservative Party

References

External links 

Visit Follo

Districts of Viken